Yamanoi (written: 山ノ井 lit. "mountain well") is a Japanese surname. Notable people with the surname include:

Eri Yamanoi (born 1978), Japanese swimmer
Jin Yamanoi (born 1962), Japanese voice actor
Kazunori Yamanoi (born 1962), Japanese politician
, Japanese footballer
Tomohiro Yamanoi (born 1977), Japanese swimmer

Japanese-language surnames